Tunkin Depression is a volcanic field in Russia.

The Tunkin Depression itself is a  tectonic depression, part of the Baikal Rift Zone, between Lake Baikal and Khövsgöl Nuur. The depression consists of a number of basins and is covered by alluvial sediments of the Irkut River. The basin is bordered by the Tunka Range to the north and by the Khamar-Daban mountains to the south. The history of the Baikal Rift begins in the Mesozoic, when intracontinental extension took place at the rift. In the Cenozoic, rifting proper commenced generating basins that were filled by sediments and basaltic volcanism. The causes of the rifting are unclear and may involve either tectonic effects of the India-Asia collision, mantle plumes and asthenospheric processes.

The volcanic field consists of numerous cinder cones and lava flows west of the western tip of Lake Baikal. The largest number of individual volcanoes is found close to the town of Tunka and is named the Khobok group. Four other groups of volcanoes are found in the Tunkin Depression.

The field has produced basalt, which in this field contains carbonatite, olivine or palagonite. The basalts range from alkali basalts to tholeiites. Volcanism may have protracted through the Pleistocene and Holocene; potassium-argon dating of some cones has yielded several ages, including 1.58 ± 0.14 million years ago and 700,000 ± 400,000 years before present.

References 

Volcanoes of Russia
Pleistocene volcanoes